Eupoecilia sumbana is a species of moth of the family Tortricidae. It is found on Sumba in Indonesia.

References

Moths described in 1953
Eupoecilia